The Roman Catholic Archdiocese of Saurimo is an archdiocese located in the city of Saurimo in Angola. Prior to its elevation to an archdiocese in 2011 it belonged to the Ecclesiastical province of Luanda. It has oversight of two suffragan dioceses, which until then had been part of other Angolan Provinces, are the Diocese of Lwena and the Diocese of Dundo.

History
 10 August 1975: Established as Diocese of Henrique de Carvalho
 16 May 1979: Renamed as Diocese of Saurimo
 12 April 2011: Elevated to Archdiocese

Statistics
The new Archdiocese, according to undated statistics released by the Vatican website because of the appointment, has a total area of 77,600 km², a total population of 420,000, a Catholic population of 61,700, 11 priests, and 28 religious.

Special churches
The Cathedral of the diocese is Sé Catedral de Nossa Senhora da Assunção (Cathedral Church of the Assumption of Our Lady) in Saurímo.

Leadership
Bishops of Henrique de Carvalho
 Manuel Franklin da Costa (10 August 1975 – 3 February 1977), appointed Archbishop of Huambo
 Pedro Marcos Ribeiro da Costa (3 February 1977 – 16 May 1979)
Bishops of Saurimo
 Pedro Marcos Ribeiro da Costa (16 May 1979 – 15 January 1997)
 Eugenio Dal Corso,  (15 January 1997 – 18 February 2008), appointed Bishop of Benguela
after serving as bishop coadjutor from 1995 to 1997
Archbishops of Saurimo
 Archbishop José Manuel Imbamba (12 April 2011 – present)

Suffragan dioceses
Diocese of Dundo
Diocese of Lwena

See also
Roman Catholicism in Angola

Sources
 GCatholic.org

Saurimo
Saurimo
Roman Catholic dioceses and prelatures established in the 20th century
Saurimo